The Occasional Millionaire or The Reluctant Millionaire is a 1973 Vietnamese 35mm eastmancolor film directed by Lê Hoàng Hoa.

Plot

Production
Location is Saigon and Vũng Tàu in 1974.

Art

 Genre : Adventure, comedy, romance, action, crime.
 Production director : Quốc Phong
 Art director : Lưu Trạch Hưng
 Director : Lê Hoàng Hoa
 Dialogue : Nguyễn Phương
 Technology scene : Lê Hoàng Hoa
 Director assistant : Bùi Nhật Quang
 Camera : Lưu Hải Lâm
 Photograph director : Diên An
 Photograph assistant : Lê Thiện Minh
 Film assembly : Nguyễn Bá Lộc
 Text : Nguyễn Vi Cartoon Studio
 Secretary : Phương Hồng Loan
 Music : Hoàng Trọng, Nguyễn Minh Trí
 Sound : Lê Văn Kính, Tô Minh Đức
 Costume : Thiết Lập & Tuấn Tailorshop
 Make up : Âu Ân Bình
 Electromechanic : Trương Sĩ Liên

Cast

 Thanh Việt
 Thanh Nga
 Ngọc Tuyết
 Văn Chung
 Ngọc Đức
 Thanh Hoài
 Túy Hoa
 Kiều Hạnh
 Thanh Long
 Phương Hồng Ngọc
 Trần Tỷ
 Lê Hiền
 Khả Năng
 Bé Bự
 Huy Khanh
 Bảo Lâm
 Duy Phúc
 Minh Sơn
 Văn Phương
 Vân An
 Quang Phước
 Thế Vi
 Quỳnh Mai

References

External links
 
 Lê Quang Thanh Tâm, Pre-1975 South Vietnamese Cinema, HochiMinh City Culture and Art Publishing House, Saigon, 2015.
 Sovereignty, Surveillance and Spectacle in The Saigon Fabulous Four
 Hề râu Thanh Việt – Duyên hài thiên phú

Lê Hoàng Hoa
Vietnamese adventure films
Vietnamese crime films
Vietnamese comedy films
Vietnamese parody films
Vietnamese thriller films
1973 films